V. arvensis may refer to:
 Veronica arvensis, the corn speedwell, common speedwell, speedwell, rock Speedwell, wall Speedwell, a medicinal plant species and a noxious weed
 Viola arvensis, the field pansy, a flowering plant species

See also
 Arvensis (disambiguation)